Qeelin is a fine jewellery company. The brand's products refer to mystical or superstitious symbols strongly embedded in the Chinese culture. The name Qeelin comes from the Qilin, an auspicious Chinese mythical animal and icon of love.

Qeelin was created in 2004 by Dennis Chan and Guillaume Brochard. The company is headquartered in Hong-Kong and owned by the French luxury group Kering.

History

Launch in Paris 

The idea of creating a luxury brand strongly embedded in the Chinese culture came to the designer Dennis Chan while visiting the Dunhuang Caves along the Silk Road in 1997. He co-founded with Guillaume Brochard the luxury jewellery company Qeelin in 2004 in Paris. Qeelin's first collection, the Wulu, became a hit after actress Maggie Cheung wore it at the 2004 Cannes Film Festival.

In 2009, Qeelin opened its first store in Paris, inside the Palais-Royal.

Kering acquisition 

In January 2013, the French luxury group PPR (now Kering) acquired a majority stake in Qeelin, the group's first acquisition in China. By then, Qeelin had 50 employees and 14 stores worldwide.

The acquisition enabled Qeelin to accelerate store openings (7 new stores in the first year), and to launch its first high jewelry collection. In 2015, Guillaume Brochard left the company, and Christophe Artaux became the CEO of Qeelin.

Timeline 

 2004: Launch in Paris.
 2004: Qeelin gained worldwide publicity when actress Maggie Cheung wore the Wulu during the 2004 Cannes Film Festival.
 2009: Parisian store opened in Palais-Royal.
 2013: Qeelin was acquired by Kering.
 2015: Qeelin started distribution in the USA.
 2018: Chinese actress Gulnazar became Qeelin's brand ambassador.
 2019(June/17) : Chinese Actor Xiao Zhan became brand ambassador

Designs 

The company's first collection was the Wulu, which revisited the legendary Chinese gourd, an auspicious emblem in Chinese tradition. Often inspired by mythical or superstitious myths, Qeelin's following creations used the symbols of the panda (Bo Bo), bells (Ling Long), kissing goldfish (Qin Qin), and dogs (Wang Wang).

In 2009, Qeelin launched a line of rare jadeite jewels. In 2010, Qeelin launched Maggie's bangles, a set of bracelets initially worn by Maggie Cheung. In 2012, Qeelin launched the XiXi collection to celebrate the Lion in the Chinese culture. In 2016, Qeelin collaborated with Chinese visual artist Chen Man to design a limited edition of the Bo Bo pendant. In 2017, Qeelin released 8 rooster designs to celebrate the Year of the Rooster in the Chinese zodiac.

Retailing

Activities 

Qeelin is a Chinese fine jewellery company whose products refer to mystical or superstitious symbols strongly embedded in the Chinese culture. Qeelin uses meticulous craftsmanship to create its China-inspired jewellery, and nurtures a «East meets West» philosophy to appeal to an international audience.

Qeelin opened its first store in Taiwan in 2009, and its first store in Shanghai in 2010. In June 2014, the company announced its intention to double in 2 years the number of Qeelin stores in China to 24. 

In 2015, Qeelin started to retail its products in the USA through a handful of stores, initially to cater to the Chinese diaspora in North America. 

In 2017, Qeelin opened its first store in Thailand. 

In 2018, Qeelin chose Chinese actress Gulnazar to become its new brand ambassador.

Retail stores 

Qeelin operates 32 stores and 4 Duty-free shops worldwide. Some of those stores include:
 Paris (France), Palais-Royal
 Hong Kong SAR (China), The Peninsula Hotel
 Beijing (China), Wangfu Central
 Macau SAR (China), The Venetian Macao
 Toronto (Canada), Holt Renfrew
 New York (US), Carat & Co
 Bangkok (Thailand), Sette

Management 

Qeelin is based in Hong Kong SAR and owned by the French luxury group Kering.

CEOs 
 2004-2015: Guillaume Brochard
 Since 2015: Christophe Artaux

Creative directors 
 Since 2004: Dennis Chan (also co-founder)

See also 
 Kering
 Qilin
 Chinese culture

References

External links 
 Official website

High fashion brands
Jewellery companies of China
Jewellery companies of France
Luxury brands
Companies established in 2004
Hong Kong brands
Kering brands